Gamelioides is a genus of moths in the family Saturniidae first described by Claude Lemaire in 1988.

Species
Gamelioides deniseae Naumann, Brosch & Wenczel, 2005
Gamelioides elainae (Lemaire, 1967)
Gamelioides kattyae Brechlin & Kaech & Meister, 2010
Gamelioides meisteri Brechlin, 2010
Gamelioides seitzi (Draudt, 1929)

References

Hemileucinae